The 1989 WFA Cup Final was the 19th final of the WFA Cup, England's primary cup competition for women's football teams. The showpiece event was played under the auspices of the Women's Football Association (WFA) and was known as the Niagara Therapy WFA Cup Final for sponsorship reasons. Friends of Fulham and Leasowe Pacific contested the match at Old Trafford in Manchester on 22 April 1989. Friends of Fulham made its second final appearance, after winning the trophy in 1985 with a 2–0 win over Doncaster Belles at Craven Cottage. Leasowe Pacific also entered their second final, in the sixth year of their existence, having been beaten 3–1 by the Belles in 1988.

England did not have a national women's league until 1991–1992. Friends of Fulham, who played in the Home Counties League, entered the competition at the third round stage and beat Oxford/County (8–1), Birmingham (3–2), Red Star Southampton (2–1) and Bronte (3–0) to reach the final. North West Women's League club Leasowe Pacific also entered at the third round and defeated Cardiff (9–0), Reigate (3–1), Doncaster Belles (2–1) and Notts Rangers (3–0) before reaching the final. The quarter final victory in Doncaster ensured that the final would not feature the Belles for the first time since 1982.

Before kick–off a minute's silence was observed for the victims of the Hillsborough disaster which happened the previous week in Sheffield. Friends of Fulham and the WFA expressed condolences to Leasowe Pacific, who came from the Liverpool community affected by the tragedy.

Four members of the Leasowe team had been at Hillsborough. Leasowe had postponed their league match the following day and the final had been in doubt until the team decided to play.

Watched by a crowd of just 941, Leasowe Pacific won the match 3–2, with a winning goal from Joy "Barry" McQuiggan. Future England manager Hope Powell scored both Friends of Fulham goals. The following day at 5.30pm Channel 4 screened an hour–long highlights package, produced by Trans World International and presented by Julie Welch, which attracted an audience in excess of 2.5 million. Sue Law of Millwall Lionesses, later a senior official in The Football Association, was the match summariser. 

– WFA Secretary Linda Whitehead in October 1989

"In the aftermath of the Hillsborough disaster Merseyside's Leasowe Pacific's appearance in the final provided a useful and poignant angle for editorial coverage of the event."

Match details

Bibliography

References

Cup
Women's FA Cup finals
WFA Cup Final
Everton F.C. (women) matches